is a Japanese manga series written and illustrated by Mitsuru Adachi. It was published by Shogakukan from 1980 to 1984 in the biweekly manga magazine Shōnen Big Comic (precursor to the current Weekly Young Sunday). The series was adapted into a movie, an anime television series, and a live-action television drama. It was very popular in Japan and was one of the winners of the 1982 Shogakukan Manga Award for shōnen and shōjo manga, along with Adachi's Touch.

Miyuki was Adachi's first manga adapted as an anime. The 37-episode anime series was broadcast from 31 March 1983 until 20 April 1984 on the Fuji Television network. The movie version was released on 16 September 1983. The television drama, produced by Fuji TV and Kyodo Television (a television production house), aired on 4 August 1986. The anime has been dubbed into several other languages including French and Spanish.

Storyline
Masato Wakamatsu, 16 years old, is working at the beach one summer. Having made a bad impression on his classmate/crush Miyuki Kashima, he makes a pass at another pretty girl. To Masato's shock, the girl turns out to be his younger stepsister Miyuki (15), who has been living abroad with their father for the past six years.

As school progresses, Masato starts dating Miyuki Kashima. He and his sister Miyuki are living alone together, and he is troubled by his conflicting emotions: filial and romantic feelings toward a sister who may or may not know she is not related to him by blood.

Characters

 (Anime television series), Portrayed by Masatoshi Nagase (movie)
An average high school student (later a rōnin for a year, then a college student). His mother died when he was young, and his step-mother also died when he was young, and he still misses both of them. Masato really likes Miyuki Kashima, the most popular girl in class, but keeps messing up whenever he tries to talk to her or ask her out on a date. Just before high school begins, his younger sister (also named "Miyuki") returns from living overseas with their father (Miyuki's step-father) for six years, and they now live alone in the same house. This Miyuki is the daughter of his step-mother, and there is no blood relation between them.
This causes some problems as Masato is torn between his growing feelings for his step-sister (who doesn't seem to know they aren't related by blood, and insists on having a normal brother-sister relationship while constantly speculating on "if we got married...") and his very obvious feelings for his classmate Miyuki. As a result of living with his sister, he is constantly seeing women's underwear and finding them in his pants pockets, leading to embarrassing situations with his classmate Miyuki.
Partway through the series, Masato is the second of two people to come down with the mysterious , caused by going an extended period without seeing his sister Miyuki.

 (Anime television series), Portrayed by Yukari Usami (movie)
Masato's younger step-sister, unrelated by blood. Her birthday is 9 February 1966. She has short wavy hair, though it becomes a little longer as the series progresses (a little past shoulder length at the end of the series). Despite being younger, she gets much better grades than Masato, and she excels in athletic events and English language skill, because she lived abroad with her step-father for six years. She is extremely popular among the boys at school. She has a very bright and cheerful personality. Even though Miyuki tries to brush off those actively courting her, they end up causing more headaches for Masato than Miyuki does. As her brother, Masato tries to protect Miyuki from these encroaching "wild beasts", though this protectiveness slowly becomes indistinguishable from jealousy. Miyuki also begins seeing her brother's girlfriend, Miyuki Kashima, as a rival.

 (Anime television series), Portrayed by Hiroko Mita (movie)
In the same class and homeroom as Masato all during high school, this Miyuki is Masato's girlfriend for most of the series. She has long hair and is extremely popular among the boys in the school. She has the same birthday as Miyuki Wakamatsu, though she is one year older. She has had a crush on Masato since junior high school. She is extremely proactive in their relationship, regularly asking him to come to parties and over to her house even before they started regularly dating. Miyuki is a very kind and humble person. However, she can be forceful as well, and the beginning of her relationship with Masato is punctuated by her frequently slapping him due to one misunderstanding or another due to her becoming angry. She always apologizes to Masato afterward, however, asking him to forgive her for getting angry so easily.
She is an excellent student, cook, and seamstress. In order to go to the same university as Masato (and be in the same year), she purposely missed the application deadline despite having passed the entrance exam without any trouble. She subsequently attended the same cram school just to be with him. After overhearing the Wakamatsu sibling's secret (that they aren't related by blood) at the pre-wedding dinner reception for Yūichi Sawada and Miyuki Wakamatsu, she runs away and goes on a trip to Hokkaidō in order to sort out her feelings. While there, she runs into Yūichi, who is traveling there after breaking up with the other Miyuki.

 (Anime television series), Portrayed by Daisuke Shima (movie)
Ryūichi was in the same year as Masato, but he purposely failed his high school entrance exams in order to be in the same year as Masato's sister Miyuki. He is actually a year older than Masato, but it is not explained why he was held back the first time. After graduating from high school, he was able to pass his college entrance exams the first time. He fell in love with Miyuki Wakamatsu at first sight, and is constantly telling her how they will be able to go on school trips together, graduate together, go to class reunions together, and get married together. He is very proactive in his pursuit of Miyuki, which tends to annoy Masato.
Because he's something of a delinquent, he frequently does poorly on tests, which causes a lack of sympathy from his friends and acquaintances. He also frequently tricks his friends into working part time jobs during the summer. He is very strong, which helps him to win the frequent fights he has. He rarely wears a helmet while riding his motorcycle (even when giving rides to Miyuki Wakamatsu), though he does have a helmet. His family owns the "Kissaten Dragon", a coffee shop, where he frequently works part time. Ryūichi is the first to come down with the mysterious "Miyuki Illness".

The bachelor P.E. teacher at Miyuki Wakamatsu's junior high school. He transfers to Miyuki's high school as the P.E. teacher when she graduates junior high in order to near her. He considers Ryūichi to be his rival for the affections of Miyuki Wakamatsu, and a stylized Chinese dragon (representing Ryūichi) and tiger (representing Torao) fighting is frequently employed when the two meet. He is about 20 years older than Miyuki. His mother is constantly trying to set up omiai, or marriage meetings, with potential brides, but Torao doesn't want to be with anyone other than Miyuki Wakamatsu. He was briefly engaged to another woman named Miyuki, but the marriage was called off after Torao got drunk and was mouthing off in a bar while sitting next to that Miyuki's father. At the end of the series, he finally consents to go along with his mother's omiai planning.

Miyuki Kashima's father. He is a detective with the local police department. He has a predilection for pretty young girls. After meeting Miyuki Wakamatsu during the New Year visit to the local shrine, he begins pursuing her and frequently invites her out for coffee. He frequently abuses his authority as a police detective in order to get closes to Miyuki. In return, Miyuki frequently abuses his kindness in order to get free rides to the grocery store and other locations to which she needs to go. This really annoys Masato, who is always calling him a "dirty old man" for chasing after his sister.

Kenji is in the same year as Masato, a teacher's dream student who is good at sports and academics. He is handsome and has many girl fans in school, though he stubbornly only pursues Miyuki Kashima despite the fact that she never shows any interest in him and he fails at numerous attempts to tear her and Masato apart. In his senior year he  was elated that he and Miyuki passed the local university's entrance exam while Masato failed but stunned to discover that Miyuki had deliberately missed the filing deadline for applications in order to go to the same prep school as Masato instead. He tried to drop out of university and join the prep school as well but classes were full. He's one of three pursuing the affections of Miyuki Kashima.

An old friend of the Wakamatsu family, Yūichi used to play with Masato all the time when they were younger. He was Masato's next-door neighbor until his high school years, at which point his parents moved to West Germany. He's a university student, and an excellent soccer player. In the second half of the series, he suddenly returned to Japan in order to play on the national team during the Olympics. After returning, he stays at the Wakamatsu home for a short time while looking for his own apartment. After he moves out, he begins pursuing Miyuki Wakamatsu, and even asks Masato if it's okay for him to do so. This causes Masato to really consider what his true feelings are for his step-sister. At the end of the series, Yūichi runs into Miyuki Kashima as she's travelling in Hokkaidō and trying to sort her own feelings.

Yoshio is in the same year as Masato, has similar grades and similar perverted tastes, and can be found almost anywhere Masato goes. He almost always appears when Masato and Miyuki Kashima are having or planning an important moment together, and he tries to include himself in their plans. He is constantly asking Masato how someone like Miyuki could possibly fall in love with someone like him. Yoshio has a younger sister, though he rarely talks about her and doesn't think much of her (at least not that he'll admit to). He did not attend Yūichi Sawada's and Miyuki Wakamatsu's pre-wedding banquet reception.

Sources:

Media

Manga
Second edition

Anime

The anime television series aired from 31 March 1983 to 20 April 1984 on the Fuji TV network. Because Kitty Film  was already producing the popular Urusei Yatsura anime television series, they asked Tomoyuki Miyata from Tatsunoko Pro to produce the Miyuki series, Mizuho Nishikubo to be the supervising director for the series, and had their own in-house studio (Kitty Mitaka Studio) handle the animation. Fuji TV had wanted Group TAC, the studio which had done the animation for the first Nine TV special, to do the animation, but arrangements had already been made. Subsequent Adachi works were all animated by Group TAC.

The lead role of voicing Miyuki Wakamatsu was given to Yōko Oginome after she auditioned for Kitty Film's Shonben Rider. Masatoshi Nagase, the voice actor for Masato Wakamatsu, is known for his passionate acting and his love scenes.

Kitty Records was contracted to provide the music for the series, and one group, H2O, supplied the opening theme and two of the three ending themes. H2O's song  was a hit, reaching #6 on the Oricon charts. It is considered one of the "standard songs" from 1980's era Japan.

The series uses four pieces of theme music: an opening and three closing themes.

After its original run on the Fuji TV network, the series was rebroadcast on the NTV network in 1986.

A Spanish language dub of the anime series was made in Venezuela in 1992 and aired on Telecinco in Spain and in Latin America.  The series is known as Vacaciones de verano ("Summer Vacation") in Spanish and the dubbers changed the given names of most of the main characters, with Masato becoming Tony, Miyuki Kashima changed to Katia, and Miyuki Wakamatsu altered to Monica.

Sources:

Film
The Miyuki anime television movie aired in the Fuji TV Nissei Family Special slot on 16 September 1983. It was directed by Kazuyuki Izutsu. Screenwriter Yumiko Takaboshi later worked on the composition of Touch anime series. It came out at the same time the Nine the Original movie was released in theaters. The Nine movie was made by the same staff which later worked on the Touch anime series.

TV drama

Masato Wakamatsu: Makoto Nonomura
Miyuki Wakamatsu: Sonoko Kawai
Miyuki Kashima: Sonoko Kawai

Staff
Original Work: Mitsuru Adachi
Teleplay: Keiji Okutsu
Director: Setsurō Wakamatsu
Sources:

Notes

References

External links
 5-Ace  (official DVD site)
 
 

1980 manga
1983 anime films
1983 anime television series debuts
1984 comics endings
1984 Japanese television series endings
Animated films based on manga
Anime series based on manga
Films directed by Kazuyuki Izutsu
Fuji TV original programming
Japanese television dramas based on manga
Japanese television specials
Live-action films based on manga
Manga adapted into films
Mitsuru Adachi
School life in anime and manga
Shogakukan franchises
Shogakukan manga
Shōnen manga
Winners of the Shogakukan Manga Award for shōnen manga